is a Japanese voice actor from Tokushima Prefecture, Japan. He is affiliated with Early Wing.

Biography
Ōsaka is the middle child of three siblings. He played on a baseball team in elementary school and on the softball team as pitcher in secondary school. He was involved with anime while attending junior high school, but had no particular dream on acting before entering high school. After graduating from a local technical high school, Ōsaka moved to Tokyo with a friend who also wanted to be a voice actor, and studied the basics of acting for two years at Nippon Kogakuin Hachioji College. After graduating, Ōsaka attended a voice actor training school, passed the additional audition for the agency Early Wing, and made his debut in 2010.

In April 2012, Ōsaka voiced Yuki Sanada in Tsuritama. Yukio Nagasaki, who saw his performance at the audition, said he thought that he could become the face of "a new generation of male voice actors in main roles". Nagasaki's support won Ōsaka the role. At the first post-recording, he was nervous and was encouraged by his co-star Tomokazu Sugita, who told him, "We will work, so you can concentrate." He received Best Male Newcomer at the 9th Seiyu Awards in 2015. He also hosts the radio show  along with voice actor Natsuki Hanae. Ōsaka announced his marriage to fellow voice actress Manami Numakura on October 23, 2019. Numakura gave birth to their first child, a boy, on December 19, 2021.

Feature
Kenji Nakamura, director of Tsuritama, said, "There is no sarcasm when you listen to him, or rather, he has a clear and colorless voice, like water, which is suitable for a leading role" and Nippon Broadcasting System announcer Naoki Yoshida said, "The main character can grow correctly without being deliberate". His best role is that of "a cheerful boy in high school".
He says that wanting to be like Rid Herschel from Tales of Eternia, played by Akira Ishida, is what inspired him to become a voice actor, and he considers Ishida to be his target voice actor . Among the roles played by Ishida, he especially likes characters like Rid and Athrun Zala from Mobile Suit Gundam SEED, who seem to be the main characters.
He says that he loves to sing, and he also does singing work. She also loves to sing, and does some singing as well.She is also very active in interacting with her fans, saying that receiving their voices at events helps her in her work.

Filmography

Anime
2011
 Kimi to Boku – Palmo
 Mashiroiro Symphony – Koichi Mizuhara

2012
 Medaka Box Abnormal – Hyakucho Hayama
 Muv-Luv Alternative – Total Eclipse – Kil Efremov
 My Little Monster – Sōhei Sasahara
 OniAi – Akito Himenokōji
 Sket Dance – Kiri Kato
 Sword Art Online – "Red-Eyed" XaXa (Laughing Coffin member)
 Tsuritama – Yuki Sanada

2013
 Ace of Diamond – Eijun Sawamura
 Attack on Titan – Marco Bodt
 Beast Saga – Kannigaroo
 Blood Lad – Staz Charlie Blood
 Chihayafuru 2 – Tashiro (Ep. 4, 6), Masaki Ono (Ep. 9, 14)
 Danbōru Senki Wars – Arata Sena
 Gatchaman Crowds – Sugane Tachibana
 Gingitsune – Youta Fujimura
 Haganai Next – Toma Suzutsuki 
 High School DxD New – Vali Lucifer
 JoJo's Bizarre Adventure – Mark 
 Log Horizon – Shōryū
 Magi: The Kingdom of Magic – Sphintus Carmen
 Nagi-Asu: A Lull in the Sea – Kaname Isaki
 Oreshura – Eita Kidō
 Rozen Maiden: Zurückspulen – Jun Sakurada
 Strike the Blood –  Motoki Yaze
 Super Seisyun Brothers – Chika Shinmoto
 Yondemasuyo, Azazel-san Z – Gagiel Amano 
 Teekyu 3 – Yōta Oshimoto
 The Devil Is a Part-Timer! – Sadao Maou/Satan Jacob
 Valvrave the Liberator – Haruto Tokishima

2014
 Argevollen – Tokimune Susumu
 Brynhildr in the Darkness – Ryōta Murakami
 Dai-Shogun - Great Revolution – Sutemaru
 Denkigai no Honya-san – Umio
 Glasslip – Kakeru Okikura
 Gundam Reconguista in G – Klim Nick
 Hamatora – Nice
 Hero Bank – Ryōma Ishin
 Hunter × Hunter (2011) – Kanzai
 If Her Flag Breaks – Sōta Hatate
 Knights of Sidonia – Nagate Tanikaze
 Log Horizon 2nd Season – Shōryū
 Re: Hamatora – Nice
 Shōnen Hollywood -Holly Stage for 49- – Kakeru Kazama
 Sugar Soldier – Shun Iriya
 Sword Art Online II – Shouichi Shinkawa
 Tales of Zestiria: Doushi no Yoake – Mikleo
 Your Lie in April – Ryota Watari

2015
 Ace of Diamond: Second Season – Eijun Sawamura
 Assassination Classroom – Yūma Isogai
 Attack on Titan: Junior High – Marco Bodt
 Aldnoah.Zero 2nd Season – Klancain
 Charlotte – Shō (Ep. 3)
 Gatchaman Crowds insight – Sugane Tachibana
 Haikyū!! 2 – Keiji Akaashi
 High School DxD BorN – Vali Lucifer
 Knights of Sidonia: War of the Ninth Planet – Nagate Tanikaze
 Kuroko's Basketball 3 – Chihiro Mayuzumi
 Mini Hama: Minimum Hamatora – Nice
 Miss Monochrome: The Animation 3 – Sobasshi
 Rakudai Kishi no Cavalry – Ikki Kurogane
 Shōnen Hollywood -Holly Stage for 50- – Kakeru Kazama
 Show by Rock!! – Kai
 Snow White with the Red Hair – Zen Wistalia
 Takamiya Nasuno Desu! – Yōta Oshimoto
 Teekyu 4 – Yōta Oshimoto
 Teekyu 6 – Yōta Oshimoto
 Ushio and Tora – Satoru Moritsuna
 Yamada-kun and the Seven Witches – Ryū Yamada

2016
 Ajin: Demi-Human  – Keisuke Nakajima
 All Out!! – Mutsumi Hachiōji
 Aokana: Four Rhythm Across the Blue – Masaya Hinata
 Assassination Classroom Second Season – Yūma Isogai
 Days – Atomu Isurugi
 Kabaneri of the Iron Fortress – Sukari
 The Lost Village – Reiji
 Mobile Suit Gundam: Iron-Blooded Orphans – Hash Midi
 Monster Hunter Stories: Ride On – Cheval
 Prince of Stride: Alternative – Hajime Izumino
 Show by Rock!!♯ – Kai
 Show By Rock!! Short!! – Kai
 Snow White with the Red Hair 2 – Zen Wistalia
 Tales of Zestiria the X – Mikleo
 Taboo Tattoo – Varma
 Teekyu 7 – Yōta Oshimoto
 Touken Ranbu: Hanamaru – Shishiou
 Trickster – Kensuke Hanasaki
 Undefeated Bahamut Chronicle – Fugil Arcadia

2017
 Black Clover – Sekke Bronzazza
 Classroom of the Elite – Yousuke Hirata
 Dive!! – Ryō Ohira
 Kabukibu! – Shin Akutsu
 Love and Lies – Yukari Nejima
 Mahōjin Guru Guru – Vivian (Ep. 19, 21 - )
 NTR: Netsuzou Trap – Takeda
 Sengoku Night Blood – Hanbee Takenaka
 Tales of Zestiria the X Season 2 – Mikleo
 UQ Holder! Magister Negi Magi! 2 – Xingzi Chao

2018
 Devils' Line – Naoya Ushio
 Gundam Build Divers – Shahryar
 Hakata Tonkotsu Ramens – Yusuke Harada
 Hakyu Hoshin Engi – Ouma
 High School DxD Hero – Vali Lucifer
 Nil Admirari no Tenbin: Teito Genwaku Kitan – Hisui Hoshikawa
 Overlord II – Climb
 Shinkansen Henkei Robo Shinkalion the Animation  – Ryūji Kiyosu
 Ulysses: Jeanne d'Arc and the Alchemist Knight – Montmorency
 Zoku Touken Ranbu: Hanamaru – Shishiou

2019
 Ace of Diamond Act II – Eijun Sawamura
 A Certain Scientific Accelerator – Mikihiko Hishigata
 Ensemble Stars! – Ibara Saegusa
 Girly Air Force – Kei Narutani
 Grimms Notes The Animation – Ekusu
 Is It Wrong to Try to Pick Up Girls in a Dungeon? II – Apollo
Star-Myu: High School Star Musical 3 – Masashi Irinatsu
The Ones Within – Ken Kudou
We Never Learn – Nariyuki Yuiga

2020
Haikyū!! To The Top – Keiji Akaashi
Interspecies Reviewers – Incubus
The Misfit of Demon King Academy – Kanon
Yu-Gi-Oh! Sevens - Arata Arai

2021
Farewell, My Dear Cramer – Kaoru Takei
Fena: Pirate Princess – Kaede
Heaven's Design Team – Yokota
Higehiro – Kyouya Yaguchi
Show by Rock!! Stars!! – Kai
So I'm a Spider, So What? – Wrath
The Hidden Dungeon Only I Can Enter – Noir Stardia
Tokyo Revengers – Naoto Tachibana

2022
Classroom of the Elite 2nd Season – Yousuke Hirata
Demon Slayer: Kimetsu no Yaiba – Entertainment District Arc – Gyutaro
Engage Kiss – Mihail Hachisuka
Love Flops – Asahi Kashiwagi
Salaryman's Club – Tōya Saeki
Shinobi no Ittoki – Ittoki Sakuraba
The Devil Is a Part-Timer!! – Sadao Maou/Sadao Maō

2023
Berserk of Gluttony – Fate Graphite
Classroom of the Elite 3rd Season – Yousuke Hirata
Endo and Kobayashi Live! The Latest on Tsundere Villainess Lieselotte – Artur Richter
MF Ghost – Kōki Sawatari
Opus Colors – Kyo Takise
The Tale of the Outcasts – Snow

Theatrical animation
 Ao Oni: The Animation – Kōji Manabe
 Knights of Sidonia: Love Woven in the Stars – Nagate Tanikaze
 Farewell, My Dear Cramer: First Touch – Kaoru Takei

Web animation
 Mobile Suit Gundam Thunderbolt – Billy Hickham
 Koro-sensei Q! – Yūma Isogai
 Powerful Pro Yakyū Powerful Kōkō-hen – Subaru Hoshii

Original video animation (OVA)
 Rescue Me! – Masayuki Mizutani
 Nijiiro Prism Girl – Touya Ichinose
 Yamada-kun and the Seven Witches – Ryū Yamada
 Oresuki: Oretachi no Game Set – Tatsuo Shiba
 Mushoku Tensei: Jobless Reincarnation (Eris no Goblin Tōbatsu) – Cliff

Drama CD
Like a Butterfly – Taiichi Kawasumi
KonoSuba - Kazuma Sato

Multimedia projects
 Aoppella!? - Tanba Rin

Video games
Tatsunoko vs. Capcom: Ultimate All-Stars – Ryu
Akane-sasu Sekai de Kimi to Utau – Saitō Hajime
Akiba's Trip 2 – Protagonist (Nanashi)
Dengeki Bunko: Fighting Climax – Sadao Maō
Fairy Fencer F – Fang
Extraordinary Ones  - Cicada
La storia della Arcana Famiglia 2 – Teo
Tales of Zestiria – Mikleo
Granblue Fantasy – Percival
Yumeiro Cast – Kyōya Asahina
Ensemble Stars! – Ibara Saegusa
BlackStar: Theater Starless – Sinju
Closers (2017) – Haruto
Love Scramble – Ota Kisaki
Our World is Ended – Reiji Gozen
Pokémon Masters – Blue
Monster Hunter Stories – Cheval
World Flipper – Yuell
Captain Tsubasa: Dream Team – Fei Xiang
Identity V - Lawyer/Freddy Riley
Genshin Impact – Bennett
Last Cloudia - Zekus
Samurai Warriors 5 - Ieyasu Tokugawa 
Cookie Run – Adventurer Cookie
Soul Hackers 2 - Kaburagi
Fairy Fencer F: Refrain Chord – Fang
Arknights – Ebenholz
Xenoblade Chronicles 3 – Zeon

Dubbing

Live-action
Ender's Game – Andrew "Ender" Wiggin (Asa Butterfield)
The Merciless – Hyun-soo (Im Si-wan)

Animation
Miraculous: Tales of Ladybug & Cat Noir – Adrien Agreste/Cat Noir
The Summit of the Gods – Buntaro Kishi

References

External links 
 Official agency profile 

 Ryōta Ōsaka at GamePlaza-Haruka Voice Acting Database 
 Ryōta Ōsaka at Hitoshi Doi's Seiyuu Database
 

1986 births
Living people
Japanese male video game actors
Japanese male voice actors
Male voice actors from Tokushima Prefecture
21st-century Japanese male actors